Lassiter House may refer to:

Lassiter House (Autaugaville, Alabama), listed on the National Register of Historic Places (NRHP)
Lassiter House (Macon, Georgia), listed on the NRHP in Bibb County, Georgia

See also
W.W. Lassiter Wholesale Grocery Warehouse, Vicksburg, Mississippi, listed on the NRHP in Warren County, Mississippi
Lassiter (disambiguation)